Dianna Aleksandrovna "Dina" Korzun (born 13 April 1971) is a Russian actress.

Life and career
Korzun was born in Smolensk. She graduated from secondary school and Art school, studied ballet and modern dancing. After graduation from the Moscow Art Theatre School, she was invited to join the Chekhov Moscow Art Theatre, where she was a stage actress (1996–2000). Her major roles were Katerina in Storm, She in I Can't Imagine Tomorrow, and Helena in Midsummer Night's Dream. Korzun made her screen debut in Valery Todorovsky's Country of the Deaf (1998) as Yaya, a deaf and mentally ill young woman.

Her other significant role is Tanya in Last Resort (2000) by Paweł Pawlikowski, for which she won the Best actress prize at the British Independent Film Awards (Best Newcomer on screen), London Film Festival (FIPRESCI Prize), Bratislava International Film Festival, Gijón International Film Festival, and Thessaloniki Film Festival.

In 2006, Korzun was nominated for the Best Female Lead at the Independent Spirit Award for her role in Forty Shades of Blue as Laura, a young Russian woman living in Memphis with a much older musician partner. In 2009, she was nominated for the Independent Spirit Award for Best Supporting Female for the movie Cold Souls.

In 2006, Korzun co-founded the Podari Zhizn charity foundation, which helps children suffering from oncological and hematological diseases.

Personal life
Korzun speaks Russian and English fluently and has acted in both of these languages.

Recognition
She was recognized as one of the BBC's 100 women of 2013.

Filmography

References

External links

1971 births
Living people
People from Smolensk
Russian film actresses
Russian television actresses
Russian stage actresses
Recipients of the Nika Award
BBC 100 Women
Moscow Art Theatre School alumni